River View High School is a public high school located in Kennewick, Washington that serves 225 students in grades 9–12. 65% of the students are white, while 30% are Hispanic, 3% are two or more races, 1% are American Indian and 1% are Asian.
Riverview in 2018 built a new football stadium, commonly known as Panthers Field.
The high school finished a "modernization" remodel project in 2018.

References

External links
River View H.S.
Finley School District #053

Public high schools in Washington (state)
High schools in Benton County, Washington